Gentiana glauca is a species of flowering plant in the gentian family known by the common names pale gentian and glaucous gentian. It is native to eastern Asia and northwestern North America from Alaska to the Northwest Territories to Washington and Montana.

This perennial herb produces a rosette of oval leaves each  centimeters long from a rhizome. Leaves on the stem are oppositely arranged. The stem grows to a maximum height near . The fruit is a tubular capsule. The plant reproduces sexually by seed and spreads vegetatively by sprouting from its rhizome.

This plant grows on tundra and in a variety of moist, treeless habitat types. It occurs in subalpine and alpine climates.

References

glauca
Flora of the Northwestern United States
Flora of Alaska